Brian Drummond (born August 10, 1969) is a Canadian voice actor. He formerly served on the board of directors for the New Westminster-based Urban Academy along with his wife, Laura Drummond, also a voice artist. Usually working in Vancouver, he tends to be cast as an antagonist.

Career
Drummond was born in Salmon Arm, British Columbia. A graduate of the acclaimed Studio 58, he started out as a theatre actor, but eventually found himself moving into voice acting full-time. Based out of Vancouver, BC, he works on various animated programs.

Most well known for his role as Vegeta, Yajirobe, and Vegito in the Ocean Studios English dub of the anime series Dragon Ball Z, Drummond tends to be cast as either an impassive warrior (Andrew Waltfeld), or a kind-hearted father-figure (Reverend Malchio). Lately, he has also played the role of the cowardly Yuna Roma Seiran in Mobile Suit Gundam SEED Destiny as well as Ryuk in Death Note. He has landed prominent roles in various anime such as Renkotsu in Inuyasha, and Gundam Wing as Zechs Merquise. Brian has also appeared in Da Vinci's Inquest in minor background roles.

He was originally cast as Cyclops, the lead male protagonist of X-Men: Evolution. He recorded the very first episode of the show, but the series was eventually re-cast with Kirby Morrow in the role.

In 2003, Drummond voiced Kurt Wylde in the computer-animated film, Hot Wheels: World Race. In 2005, he reprised his role as Kurt Wylde in the computer-animated film series, Hot Wheels: AcceleRacers.

From 2006 until 2008, he voiced Ork Warboss Gorgutz in the video game Warhammer 40,000: Dawn of War, and several other expansion packs under the Dawn of War title.

He recently participated in Funimation's English dub as a cloned version of Vegeta for Dragon Ball Super, where Drummond notably worked alongside his Funimation counterpart Christopher Sabat who provided Vegeta's voice for the Funimation version of the Dragon Ball English dub.

Personal life
He is married to Laura Drummond and has a son and two daughters, Aidan (born 1995), Brynna (born 1997, pronounced BRIN-ah), and Ashlyn, who have also begun to follow in their father's voice-over work. His daughter Brynna voiced Babs Seed, the cousin of Apple Bloom and her siblings, on the television series My Little Pony: Friendship is Magic, a show which Drummond also appears in. His son Aidan voiced Marty, the main character who earns the titular name in the animated series Eon Kid.

Voice roles

Anime
 Black Lagoon – Benny and Wentzel Ahbe
 Black Lagoon: Roberta's Blood Trail – Benny
 Black Lagoon: The Second Barrage – Benny and Wentzel Ahbe
 Brain Powerd – Lasse Lundberg
 Cardcaptors – Aiden Avalon and Mr. Terada
 Cardcaptors: The Movie – Aiden Avalon and Mr. Terada
 Death Note – Ryuk, Suguru Shimura, Zakk Irius, Roy and Sudo
 Death Note Re-Light: Visions of a God – Ryuk and Suguru Shimura
 Death Note Re-Light 2: L's Successors – Ryuk
 Dragon Ball Super (Funimation dub) – Copy Vegeta
 Dragon Ball Z (Ocean Group dub) – Vegeta, Yajirobe, Fortuneteller Baba, Vegito, King Vegeta, Pikkon and Yamu
 Dragon Drive - Mahiru
 Dragon Quest: The Adventure of Dai - Hadlar and Flazzard
 Elemental Gelade – Jimothy Cubege
 Escaflowne (Ocean Group Dub) – Allen Schezar 
 The Girl Who Leapt Through Time – Makoto's Father
 Ghost in the Shell: Stand Alone Complex: The Laughing Man – Saito
 Ghost in the Shell: Stand Alone Complex 2nd GIG: Individual 11 – Saito
 Hamtaro – Tongari-kun and Hambeard
 Inuyasha – Renkotsu, Juromaru and Kageromaru
 Key the Metal Idol – Hikaru Tsurugi
 Master Keaton – Travis, Mikami and Petrol Station Clerk
 Master Keaton (OVA version) – Leon Hannah, Assissant Professor Yamamoto and Eliah's Father
 Megaman NT Warrior – SkullMan, Heatman, WhaleMan, SnakeMan and MoltanicMan
 Megaman NT Warrior: Axcess – HeatMan, SkullMan and WhaleMan
 Mobile Suit Gundam: Encounters in Space – Bernard Monsha
 Mobile Suit Gundam Wing – Zechs Merquise/Milliardo Peacecraft
 Mobile Suit Gundam SEED – Andrew Waltfeld, Reverend Malchio, Ahmed El-Fasi 
 Mobile Suit Gundam SEED Destiny – Andrew Waltfeld, Reverend Malchio and Yuna Roma Seiran
 Mobile Suit Gundam 00 – Brian Stegmeyer, Dr. Moreno, Homer Katagiri, Federation President and Bring Stabity
 Monster Rancher – Tiger
 Nana – Yasushi Takagi
 Ōban Star-Racers – Satis, Colonel Toros and Zard
 Popotan – Keith
 Powerpuff Girls Z – Poncho
 Project ARMS – Hayato Shingu
 Project ARMS: The 2nd Chapter – Hayato Shingu
 Ranma ½ – Yasukichi, Joe and Shadow Ranma
 Shakugan No Shana – Additional voices, Rinne, Denizens of the Crimson Realm and Merihim
 The SoulTaker – Dr. Kyoya
 Starship Operators – Kouki Sakakibara and Lewis Belmont
 Transformers Armada – Blurr
 Transformers Energon – ShockBlast
 Transformers Cybertron – Jetfire and Jolt
 The Vision of Escaflowne – Allen Schezar and Susumu Amano (Bandai Entertainment dub)
 Zoids: New Century Zero – Jack Cisco and Oscar Hemeros
 Zoids: Fuzors – Blake

Animation
 16 Hudson – JP
 Action Dad – Mr. Bald, Referee, Joe and Sheldon
 Action Man: X Missions – The Movie – Red Wolf
 Amelia's Moving Pictures – Mr. Nudel
 Astonishing X-Men – Wolverine
 Baby Looney Tunes – Floyd Minton and Baby Elmer
 Barbie: Fairytopia – Larkspur
 Barbie: Princess Charm School – Prince, Guard and Royal Judge Man
 Barbie and the Magic of Pegasus – Ferris and Aiden's Father
 Barbie and the Three Musketeers – Musketeer #2
 Barbie as the Island Princess – Lorenzo
 Barbie as the Princess and the Pauper – Nick and Guard 1
 Barbie of Swan Lake – Reggie
 Barbie Thumbelina – Poofles
 Beast Machines – Jetstorm
 Beat Bugs – Postman Bee, Glowies
 Billy the Cat – Billy
 Bionicle 2: Legends of Metru Nui – Matau, Onewa
 Bionicle 3: Web of Shadows – Matau and Onewa
 Bob the Builder – Carl Parker (US), Roland (US) and Mayor Snipe (US)
 Bob the Builder: Mega Machines – Ace (US)
 Bratz: Desert Jewelz – Charlat, Operator and Prod. Assissant
 Bratz Babyz Save Christmas – Santa Claus, Cop, Waiter and Mall Employee
 Bratz Kidz: Fairy Tales – Chadwick, Mr. Grimm and Nick
 Bratz Kidz: Sleep-Over Adventure – Cloe's Dad and Sr. Miracle
 Bratz Girlz Really Rock – Jules
 Charlie and Lola – Soren Lorenson (Canadian dub only)
 Class of the Titans – Hermes, Oracle, Agnon, Hephaestus, Gary and Sam
 Coconut Fred's Fruit Salad Island – Lemon Wedge
 Corner Gas Animated – Zeke, Ike, Impersonator #1, Sasquatch, Trucker, Plasti-Potty Guy, Old Man Wilkie, Werewolf Guy, Radio Announcer, Priest (1), News Broadcaster
 Dinosaur Train – Alvin Allosaurus, Larry Lambeosaurus, Eugene Euoplocephalus, Mr. Quetzalcoatlus, Mr. Therizinosaurus, Zhuang Zigongosaurus, Quinn Qantassaurus and Apollo Apatosaurus
 Dinotrux – Dozer, Break-Itt, George, Otto #1, Drago-O, Woodland Reptool Leader, Wings, Tops, Craneosaur #1 (1), Stegarbasaur #1, Craneosaur #2, Hydrodon, Rumble Grumble
 Doggie Daycare – Crocket
 Dragon Booster – Kawake, Saynn and Additional voices
 The Dragon Prince – Ziard
 Dreamkix – Andres, Hudson and Viali Goat
 Dr. Dimensionpants – Dunley, Psycho Steve, Glug, Dutch, Dr Dimensionsocks, Glass Skull
 Exchange Student Zero – General Chaos
 Fat Dog Mendoza – Cruddy McFearson
 Gadget & the Gadgetinis – Dr. Claw, Dr. Thaw
 George of the Jungle – Witch Doctor
 Geronimo Stilton – Geronimo Stilton and Simon Squealer
 G.I. Joe Extreme – Ballistic
 G.I. Joe: Ninja Battles – Tiger Claw
 G.I. Joe: Valor vs. Venom – Slash
 GeoTrax (2007 animated series) – Bruno, Goggles, Samuel, Irving
 He-Man and the Masters of the Universe – Stinkor, Two-Bad (Tuvar), Belzar, Unilope Shepherd, Claw Guy 2, Odiphus and Tuvar
 Henchmen – Old Doug
 Hero 108 – Jumpy Ghostface, High Roller, Sparky White, Sailor Brothers, Golden Eye Husky, Master Chou, Elephant King, Cheetah King, Groundhog King and Human Man
 Hot Wheels AcceleRacers: Breaking Point – Kurt Wylde
 Hot Wheels AcceleRacers: Ignition – Kurt Wylde
 Hot Wheels AcceleRacers: The Speed of Silence – Kurt Wylde
 Hot Wheels AcceleRacers: The Ultimate Race – Kurt Wylde
 Hot Wheels Highway 35 - World Race – Kurt Wylde
 Hot Wheels Battle Force 5 – Sherman Cortez, Krytus, Zug, Krocomodo, Sheriff Johnson and Blador
 Hot Wheels World Race – Kurt Wylde and Zed-36
 Inspector Gadget's Biggest Caper Ever – Dr. Claw
 Inspector Gadget's Last Case: Claw's Revenge – Dr. Claw
 Iron Man: Armored Adventures – Crimson Dynamo, Iron Manager and O'Brian
 Journey To GloE – Swasn't/Barkington
 Kate and Mim-Mim – Gobble
 Kid vs. Kat – Harley and Buck Diamond
 Krypto the Superdog – Streaky the Supercat and Eddie Whitney
 LeapFrog – Additional voices
 Lego Jurassic World: Legend of Isla Nublar – Additional voices
 Lego Nexo Knights – Axl, Merlock, King Halbert, Herb Herbertson
 Lego Ninjago: Masters of Spinjitzu – Kruncha and Nuckal, Iron Baron, Smith Daryll, Percy Shippelton, Char, Elemental Cobra, Krag, Grimfax, Formling Leader, Newbie Gamer, Sage Master, Hailmar, Gleck, Minos, Engelbert, Twitchy Tim, Zippy, PoulErik (top head), Gripe
 Lego Star Wars: Droid Tales – Watto, Zeb, Admiral Motti 
 Lego Star Wars: The Yoda Chronicles – Bobby, Gamorran Guard, Storm Trooper 1, Jabba the Hutt and Watto
 Littlest Pet Shop – Shake A Leg Judge #3, Igor Bogomolov, L-Zard, Shahrukh, Shivers, Singing Fish, Ollie Arms, Desi, Tiny, Octopus Creature, Big and Feathered Parade Judge, Ling Pen, Terra Cotta Warrior Chief, Chinese Dragon, Goldy and Lamasque
 Littlest Pet Shop shorts – L-Zard
 Littlest Pet Shop: A World of Our Own – Mugs Stubbytail, Roman, Pet Catcher, Captain Gilturtle, Bertram Corgiwaddle, Clicks Monkeyford
 Martha Speaks – Dr. Harold Pablum, Danny Lorraine and Skits
 Marvel Super Hero Adventures – Iron Man, Groot
 Maryoku Yummy – Fudan
 Max Steel – Butch, Troy Winter/Extroyer, Earth Elementor, Water Elementor, Thi Technician, Robber and Police Officer
 Maya the Bee – Judge Beeswax, Kurt, Deez, Edgar (season 1)
 Mega Man: Fully Charged – Principal Hundred Hundred
 ¡Mucha Lucha! – Buena Dad
 ¡Mucha Lucha!: The Return of El Maléfico – Buena Dad and El Evil Cheese Grande
 Mune: Guardian of the Moon – Spleen, Cousin 2
 My Little Pony: The Runaway Rainbow – Spike
 My Little Pony: Friendship is Magic – Ahuizotl, Caramel (S01E26), Doc Top, Double Diamond, Dr. Hooves (S01E12), "Dumb-Bell" (colt), Filthy Rich, Lucky Clover (S01E26), Mr. Cake, Noteworthy, Seabreeze, Sheriff Silverstar, Uncle Orange, Davenport (S07E19)
 My Little Pony: Equestria Girls – Rainbow Rocks – Book Delivery Pony
 My Little Pony: Equestria Girls – Legend of Everfree – Filthy Rich
 My Little Pony: The Princess Promenade – Spike
 My Little Pony Crystal Princess: The Runaway Rainbow – Spike
 My Little Pony Live: The World's Biggest Tea Party – Spike
 Nerds and Monsters – Lyle, Fighting Monster 2
 Nina's World – Sheriff Saddlehorn, Dragon, Oliver
 Open Season: Scared Silly – Ian, Reilly, Tree-Hugger Man
 Packages from Planet X – Corvis Copernicus and Leepthor
 Pac-Man and the Ghostly Adventures – Clyde, Dr. Buttocks, Butt-ler and Aide
 Pucca – Garu
 Ratchet & Clank – The Plumber, Inspectobot, Warbot, Evil Zurkons
 Rated A for Awesome – Noam
 Ready Jet Go! – Face 9000, Bergs, Don, Pizza Guy, Neil Armstrong, Customer #1, Generic Adult, Radio Reporter, Spinach, Weekend Robot, Bortronian Cook, Scientist #1, Chewy
 Rev & Roll - Rumble, Ben, Skip, Baker, Townsperson #3, Rusty, Foreman, Mr. Wilson, Nick, Movie Announcer, Mr. Mayor, Narrator
 Rollbots – Botch, Chief Surgeon Koto
 Roary the Racing Car – Additional Voices
 Slugterra – Maurice, El Diablos Nachos, Grendel, Redhook, Billy, Imperiled Townsman, Spinks, Slug Run Announcer, Sergeant Slug, Darius, Behemoth, Train Engineer Henchman 2, Movie Audience Nerd, Tobias, Boss Ember, Blast Vanderhuge, Cyrus, Molenoid Elder, Shadow Clan Lightwell Chieftain, Ice, Shadow Clan Member, Coop (2012–present)
 Slugterra: Ghoul from Beyond – Boss Ember
 Slugterra: Return of the Elementals – RedHook, TV Announcer
 Slugterra: Slug Fu Showdown – Billy 
 Sonic Prime – Doctor Eggman 
 Sonic Underground – Knuckles the Echidna
 Spider-Man Unlimited – Eddie Brock and Venom
 Storm Hawks – Carver, Gull, Dealer, Hamish and Wayside Assistant Cruiser Sales Manager
 Super Dinosaur – Squidious, Doometrodon, Lead Researcher, Dr. Scofield, Subject 42, Dino Man (2), Earth Core Agent (3), Marine Researcher, Earth Core Tech #2 (1), Computer Voice, Beta 29, Roccodon
 Super Monsters – Frankie's Dad
 The Bravest Knight – The Giant 
 The Deep – Proteus, Dolos, Danny Boy, Salvage Crew, Crewman #1, Captain Marko, Resort Worker
 The Guava Juice Show – Hampersand
 The Hollow – Death
 The Last Kids on Earth – Rover, Blarg, Wormungulous, Tres, Belly Buster, Grrravel, Eyeball Monster, Camo Beast, Bug Monster, Biggun, Zapper, Hydriathon, Possessed King Wretch, Spikapede, Tormentasaur, Scrapken, Terror-ranchala, Stuffie
 The Little Prince – The Fox (with Aidan Drummond voicing the Prince)
 The Nutty Professor – Dean V. Wu
 The Willoughbys – Baby Ruth, Phil, Yokel
 Thor: Tales of Asgard – Fenris Wolf, Additional Voices
 Tony Hawk in Boom Boom Sabotage – DJ, Hamshank, Mimic and Chopper Chuck
 Ultimate Wolverine vs. Hulk – Wolverine, Pilot and Pat
 Under Wraps – Bill, Pharaoh
 War of the Realms: Marvel Ultimate Comics – Narrator, Hot Dog Guy, Passenger #2
 What About Mimi? – Additional Voices
 Wishfart – King of the Underworld, Stephanie, Joey
 Wolverine: Origin – Wolverine and Thomas Logan
 Wolverine versus Sabretooth – Wolverine
 Wolverine: Weapon X – Wolverine, Iron Fist, Martin, Spider-Friends, Guard 1, Cop 1, Civilian 1
 X-Men: Evolution – Hunter, Julien Boudreaux
 Yakkity Yak – Keo

Live-action
 Death Note – Ryuk (voice)
 Death Note 2: The Last Name – Ryuk (voice)
 L: Change the World – Ryuk (voice)
 Marley & Me: The Puppy Years – Trouble (voice)

Video games
 CSI: Miami – Enrique Sanchez
 Devil Kings – Muri (English dub)
 Dragalia Lost – Xenos, Zhu Baije, AC-011 Garland, Ebisu, Chronos Nyx, Humanoid Zodiark, Zodiark, High Zodiark, Thaniel, Rodrigo, Karl
 Dynasty Warriors: Gundam – Milliardo Peacecraft (English dub)
 Dynasty Warriors: Gundam 2 – Milliardo Peacecraft (English dub)
 Dynasty Warriors: Gundam 3 – Milliardo Peacecraft, Heero Yuy (English dub)
 George of the Jungle and the Search for the Secret – Witch Doctor
 Mobile Suit Gundam: Encounters in Space – Bernard Monsha (English dub)
 Warhammer 40,000: Dawn of War – Dark Crusade – Gorgutz Unter, Stealth Teams, Fire Warriors, Pathfinders, Broadside Battlesuits, Crisis Battlesuits, Devilfish Troop Carriers, Skyray Missile Gunships, Drone Harbingers and Hammerhead Gunships
 Warhammer 40,000: Dawn of War – Winter Assault – Gorgutz Unter and Vindicare Temple Assassins

References

External links
 
 
 
 
 Brian Drummond information

1969 births
Living people
Canadian male video game actors
Canadian male voice actors
Male actors from British Columbia
People from Salmon Arm
Studio 58 people
Canadian people of Scottish descent
20th-century Canadian male actors
21st-century Canadian male actors